16th Lux Style Awards

Official Poster

Date: 
April 19, 2017
 
Host: 
Atif Aslam

Director: 
Hassan Sheheryar Yasin

Venue: 
Expo Center, Karachi, Sindh

Best Film:
Actor in Law

Best TV Play:
Dil Lagi

←15th Lux Style Awards  17th→
The 16th Lux Style Awards ceremony, presented by Lux to honor the best in fashion, music, films, and Pakistani television of 2016, took place on 19 April 2017 at the Expo Center, Karachi, Sindh. During the ceremony, LUX presented the Lux Style Awards (commonly referred to as LSA) in four segments including Film, Fashion, Television, and Music. Actor in Law remained the most award-winning film with 4 awards while Udaari remained the most award-winning TV series by winning 3 awards.

 18th Lux Style Awards

Winners and nominees 
Nominees for the 16th Lux Style Awards were announced on 15 March 2017.

Films

Television

Note
It was one of the few years where nominations were evenly divided among all TV channels (Hum TV, ARY Digital, TV One, and A Plus).

Music

Fashion

Presenters and performers
The following individuals presented awards or performed musical numbers.

Presenters

Performers

Ceremony information

In early April 2017, it was announced that Hassan Sheheryar Yasin would be the show's director instead of Frieha Altaf. Altaf had previously been the director for the Lux Style Awards since its inception in 2002 except for the 3rd Lux Style Awards event. On 9 April 2017, in a press conference the show's director Hassan Sheheryar Yasin announced that Atif Aslam would host the ceremony. Aslam expressed that it felt good to host the Lux Style Awards. Osman Khalid Butt was chosen as the scriptwriter for the award ceremony.

In his acceptance speech for the Best TV Actor award, Ahsan Khan paid tribute to Mashal Khan, who was lynched by a charged mob over blasphemy allegations a few days earlier. During the ceremony, the Turkish actor Halit Ergenç was presented the International Icon award. It was the first time an international celebrity was honoured at the LSAs.

M. Nadeem J. was the TV director for LSA in 2017 and has been since 2005. He was also the producer of the show in 2017 and 2018.

References

External links
 
 Lux Style Awards official website

Lux Style Awards ceremonies
2016 film awards
2016 television awards
2016 music awards
Lux
Lux
April 2017 events in Pakistan
Lux